The Jolarpettai–Bangalore City Express is an Express train belonging to South Western Railway zone that runs between  and  in India. It is currently being operated with 16519/16520 train numbers on a weekly basis.

Service

The 16519/Jolarpettai–KSR Bengaluru Express has an average speed of 40 km/hr and covers 145 km in 3h 35m. The 16520/KSR Bengaluru–Jolarpettai Express has an average speed of 44 km/hr and covers 145 km in 3h 20m.

Route and halts 

The important halts of the train are:

Coach composition

The train has standard ICF rakes with a max speed of 110 kmph. The train consists of 13 coaches:

 1 Sleeper coaches
 10 General Unreserved
 2 Seating cum Luggage Rake

Traction

Both trains are hauled by a Royapuram Loco Shed-based WDP-4 electric locomotive from Bangalore to Jolarpettai and vice versa.

See also 

 Bangalore City railway station
 Jolarpettai Junction railway station
 Arsikere−Mysore Passenger
 Night Queen Passenger
 Bangarapet–Bangalore City Express
 Bangarapet–Marikuppam Passenger

Notes

References

External links 

 16519/Jolarpettai–KSR Bengaluru Express India Rail Info
 16520/KSR Bengaluru–Jolarpettai Express India Rail Info

Transport in Bangalore
Express trains in India
Rail transport in Karnataka
Rail transport in Andhra Pradesh
Rail transport in Tamil Nadu